Texas is an unincorporated community in Washington County, in the U.S. state of Kentucky.

History
A post office called Texas was established in 1853, and remained in operation until 1964. The community was named after the state of Texas.

References

Unincorporated communities in Washington County, Kentucky
Unincorporated communities in Kentucky